The 2013–14 Qatari League, also known as Qatari Stars League was the 41st edition of top-level football championship in Qatar. The season was started on 1 September 2013 and was finished on 11 April 2014. Al-Sadd were the defending champions. Lekhwiya won its third league title with 53 points.

League expansion

At the end of the previous it was announced that the 2013–14 season would feature 14 teams. The decision to increase the numbers of teams means Al Sailiya – who finished bottom of the league – will avoid relegation. Meanwhile, Muaither – who lost to Al Arabi in the play-offs – will join as the 14th team.
The Second Division and the reserve league will also merge to create a stronger second tier. On the 6 October 2013 it was announced that the second tier would be known as the QatarGas League due to sponsorship reasons.

Teams
Al Ahli were promoted as champions from the 2nd Division. They were joined by Al-Mu'aidar who came in second place and failed to win the end of season playoff against Al-Arabi but secured promotion due to the league expansion

Stadia and locations

1 Al Sailiya do not have a stadium of their own so will share with Al Rayyan.

Personnel and kits

Note: Flags indicate national team as has been defined under FIFA eligibility rules. Players may hold more than one non-FIFA nationality.

Managerial changes

Foreign players
The number of foreign players is restricted to seven (including an Asian player) per team, with no more than five on pitch during matches.

League table

References

2013–14 in Qatari football
2013–14 in Asian association football leagues